A total of 134 Saudi citizens have been held in the United States' Guantanamo Bay detention camps at its naval base in Cuba since January 2002. Most had been swept up in Afghanistan following the US invasion in the fall of 2001, and they were classified by the US government as enemy combatants.

In addition, a United States citizen, Yaser Esam Hamdi, who was born in Louisiana but moved as a child with his parents to Saudi Arabia, where he also had citizenship, was initially held there. As an American citizen, he was transferred to a military prison brig on the mainland of the United States. His challenge to his detention, without being informed of charges or brought to trial, was a case that reached the United States Supreme Court. In Hamdi v. Rumsfeld (2004), the Supreme Court ruled that detainees who are U.S. citizens must have the rights of due process, and the ability to challenge their enemy combatant status before an impartial authority. After this decision, the government made a deal with Hamdi. After he agreed to renounce his US citizenship and observe travel restrictions, in October 2004 Hamdi was deported to Saudi Arabia. He has returned to his family.

Following the deaths of two Saudi citizens in custody on June 10, 2006, and another on May 30, 2007, which the Department of Defense claimed were due to suicides, the Saudi government put pressure on the United States to release its citizens. Nearly 100 were returned to Saudi Arabia from June 2006 through 2007.

As of today, two Saudi citizens are still held at the detention camp.

History

In January 2002, the United States completed the first phase of construction of the Guantanamo Bay detention camp at its naval base in Cuba. It was designed to hold enemy combatants captured in its war on terror - most taken during action in Afghanistan beginning in the fall of 2001. In total, the US has held 133 Saudi Arabian citizens at Guantanamo. The United States has held a total of 778 detainees in the Guantanamo Bay detention camps at its naval base in Cuba since the camps opened on January 11, 2002. The camp population peaked in 2004 at approximately 660. 

Three Saudis: Yasser Talal Al Zahrani, Mani Shaman Turki al-Habardi Al-Utaybi and Abdul Rahman al-Amri, died at Guantanamo in 2006 and 2007 during their detention. All were announced by the United States Department of Defense (DOD) as suicides.

The first two were among three men who died on June 10, 2006; the circumstances of their deaths have been strongly questioned by numerous sources, including the Saudi government and the men's families. Journalists and the Center for Policy and Research in its 2009 report have noted glaring inconsistencies in the NCIS report of 2008. Based on an account by four former guards at Guantanamo, Scott Horton suggested in 2010 that the men died as a result of torture and government agencies tried to cover this up.

Al-Amri died on May 30, 2007, as an apparent suicide, according to DOD.

As a result of these deaths, the Saudi government strongly pressured the United States to repatriate its citizens. It developed a reintegration program for former detainees and has worked with them on religious re-education, and reintegrating them into society by arranging for marriages and jobs. From June 2006 and December 2007, a total of 93 Saudi citizens were returned to the country. As of today, two Saudi citizens are still held at the detention camp.

Saudi citizens held in Guantanamo

Saudi rehabilitation
A July 26, 2007 article from Asharq Alawsat described the Care Rehabilitation Center repatriated detainees are held in until they are finally released.
According to the article the detainees received special meals, had access to satellite TV, and were able to get day passes.

British Prime Minister Gordon Brown visited the facility on November 2, 2008, and spoke with several former Guantanamo detainees.

References

External links

Saudi captives Guantanamo detainee assessment briefs

 
Detainees of the Guantanamo Bay detention camp
Saudi
Guantanamo
Guantanamo